Rangi's Catch is a 1972 children's adventure film directed by Michael Forlong.
It was based on a book by Margaret Ford.
The eponymous role is played by a young Temuera Morrison in his first role.
Originally made as eight episodes for television, it was re-edited and re-cut for a theatrical release.

Plot
Four children on a remote sheep station in the South Island of New Zealand hear of the escape of two convicts, and realise that the crooks are responsible for burgling their house while they were swimming. They pursue the crooks, and despite being detained by the police help catch the crooks and their stolen money hidden in a cave, so are rewarded. They return to their idyllic rural existence.

Cast
 Temuera Morrison as Rangi
 Andrew Kerr as Johnny Murray
 Kate Forlong as Jane Murray
 Vernon Hill as Hemi
 Ian Mune as Jake, crook
 Michael Woolf as Bill, crook
 Don Selwyn as Mr. Rukuhia
 Hannah Morrison as Mrs. Rukuhia
 Peter Vere-Jones as Mr. Murray
 Christine Elsdon as Mrs. Murray

Production
Sponsored by the Children's Film Foundation.
The eight television episodes were:-
 1. The Mysterious Campers.
 2. Escaped Convicts.
 3. Escape and Capture.
 4. Caught At Sea.
 5. Packed In The Boat.
 6. Terror In The Caves.
 7. Jet Boat.
 8. Rangi's Catch.

References

External links
 

1973 films
1970s British films
1970s English-language films
New Zealand television films
British teen films
British television films
Children's Film Foundation
Films set in New Zealand
Films shot in New Zealand
Films based on New Zealand novels
Films directed by Michael Forlong